南 may refer to:
Nan (surname), Chinese surname
Nam (Korean surname)
Minami (name), Japanese feminine given name

See also

Nam-gu (disambiguation), various districts in South Korea
南山 (disambiguation) ("south mountain")
南海 (disambiguation) ("south sea")